A beach bum trust provision, in the law of trusts, ties the ability of a trust beneficiary to take from the trust to the beneficiary's own earnings.

Background 
Such a provision serves to prevent a beneficiary from lazily living off the trust funds (i.e. a "beach bum"). If the beneficiary earns no income, then he or she reaps nothing from the trust.

References 

Wills and trusts